The Nevada Appeal is a twice-weekly newspaper published in Carson City, Nevada, by Pacific Publishing Company.

The paper has sister publications across northern Nevada:

Lahontan Valley News  & Fallon Eagle Standard (Fallon, Nevada)
Northern Nevada Business View (Reno, Nevada)
The Record-Courier (Gardnerville, Nevada)

History
The Nevada Appeal was first published in on May 16, 1865, as the Carson Daily Appeal.  It claims to be the oldest continuously published newspaper in Nevada, as well as be the oldest continuously operating business in Carson City.

It was renamed the Daily State Register in 1870.  In 1872, the Register merged with the New Daily Appeal, which had been founded earlier in 1872 by the first editor of the original Daily Appeal, Henry Rust Mighels, earlier in the year.  The paper dropped the "New" from its masthead in 1873.  In May 1877 it was renamed the Morning Appeal, then it went back to being the Daily Appeal in 1906. In 1947 it was finally renamed to the Nevada Appeal, the name it keeps to this day.

The paper's first office was a low stone building at the corner of Second and Carson Streets. On October 19, 1948, the Appeal moved to a new home at 110 W. Telegraph Street, then three years later, on July 9, 1951, it moved into the Carson Brewery at the corner of King and Division. On November 18, 1974, the paper moved again to 200 Bath St. This office was gutted by fire on March 28, 1979, but the paper stayed in business using rented facilities and equipment. The final move was on March 8, 2002, when they moved into their current facility at 580 Mallory Way.

Until 1961 it was printed by letterpress. It converted to offset printing on March 13, 1961.

From 1878 to 1880, the paper was owned by Nellie Verill Mighels, wife of Henry Mighels.  She was one of the first women in the world to own a newspaper.

From late 2008 to early 2009, the newspaper was affected by market forces that plagued the industry at large. In May 2009 the Appeal'''s print schedule was reduced to five days a week. Tuesday printings resumed in September 2010.

In July 2018, the Appeal reduced its print schedule from six to two days a week. Similar cuts were made at its sister newspapers. The Appeal'' publishes news seven days a week online.

On April 16, 2019, an edition of the Nevada Appeal was found during the opening of a time capsule from 1872 in the cornerstone of a demolished Masonic lodge in Reno.

On August 1, 2019, Pacific Publishing Company bought the Nevada Appeal from Swift Communications Inc. along with sister publications The Record-Courier, the Lahontan Valley News and Northern Nevada Business View.

References

 Carson City's oldest business turns 137 this week, May 14, 2002
 Brief history of the Nevada Appeal, March 30, 2005

External links
Official site

Newspapers published in Nevada
Carson City, Nevada
Publications established in 1865